SynSUN (short for Synthesized Sunshine) is a Ukrainian psytrance group consisting of Andrey Vakhnenko and Vitaly Samolyga, known as Andi Vax and Willy, respectively. Since their inception in 1998, SynSUN has released 5 albums, 5 EPs, and 30 miscellaneous tracks, including remixes and collaborations with Infected Mushroom, Astral Projection, Skazi, Yahel, Talamasca, Eskimo and Vibe Tribe, among others.

History
SynSUN was founded in 1998 by Andrey Vakhnenko and Vitaly Samolyga. They have performed at Tomorrowland Festival Boomerang NYE Festival, Life Festival, National Liberty Festival, as well as appearances in iconic events in Switzerland, England, Portugal, Italy, Belgium, Germany, Israel, Hungary, and Russia. Since 2010 Evgeniy Riabinin (Jackie White) stands behind the project and Andrey Vakhnenko is focusing on his own studio and his ANDI VAX project, however he still manages SynSUN from the sidelines. Since 2011, SynSUN is the leader of the psytrance genre on Showbiza.

Discography

Albums 
 2004 — Symphonic Adventures (Kagdila Records)
 2006 — Phoenix (Starsound Records)
 2007 — Unstoppable (Spliff Records)
 2008 — We Are The World (Phonokol Records)
 2011 — Alter Ego (Dacru Records)

EPs
 2008 — Set the Pace (Phonokol Records)
 2010 — Future People (Phonokol Records)
 2010 — Warm Up (Phonokol Records)
 2011 — Brave Heart (Dacru Records)
 2012 — Volume One (Planet BEN Records)

Compilations
 07. Ceremony / Goa Vol.9 (YSE)
 07. Tataria / Peace Therapy Vol.2 (Kagdila Records)
 07. Prelude / Goa Vol.17 (YSE)
 09. Tron / Goa Girl Vol.4 (YSE)
 14. Enter Sandman / Goa Girl Vol.4 (YSE)
 03. Science Fiction / Skygravity Vol.1 (Skygravity Records)
 07. Boonyasha / Jet Coaster (Sigma Production)
 10. Invisible People / Spliff it Up! by Uriya (Spliff Music)
 03. Science Fiction (Safi Connection Remix) / Psionic Groove (Digital Psionics)
 04. White and Black / Jack in the Box (Phonokol)
 05. Phoenix (Virtual Attack Remix) / Breaking News (Magma Records)
 04. Sigumo Killer / Breaking News (Magma Records)
 05. Frightful Dream (vs. Digital Tribe) / Wake Me Up (Kagdila Records)
 10. Meta Dream (Astral Waves Remix) / Astral Waves — Mystique (Sunline Records)
 20. Embryo / Goa Visions vol. 1 (Midijum Records)
 08. On the Tron / Goa Connection Vol. 2 (Goa Crops Records)
 10. Self Domination / Tokyo Sensation (Fineplay Records)
 08. Disco Bomber / United Colours Of Trance Vol. 1 (Beyond Logic Records)
 04. Astral Projection — Open Society (SynSUN Remix) / Astral Projection — The Blissdom [EP] (Trust in Trance)
 02. Mushroom Cocktail (vs. Artsense) / Artsense — Prime (Blitz Studios)
 06. Mekkainkka — Musicanical (SynSUN vs. Artsense Remix) / Artsense — Prime (Blitz Studios)
 01. Invisible People / Goa Tunes Vol. 3 (Future Audio Records)
 03. Who U Are (vs. Twina & Elik) / Twina — Secret Identity (Phonokol Records)
 05. Phoenix (Micky Noise Remix) / Micky Noise — Maya (Harmonia Records)
 08. The Key (Lamat Remix) / Lamat — New Horizons (Dacru Records)
 03. Astral Projection — Open Society (SynSUN Remix) / Astral Projection — Open Society [EP] (Trust in Trance)
 06. Future People (Exodus Remix) / Exodus — Welcome To My World (BioMechanix Records)
 06. DigiCult vs. U-Recken — Days In Space (SynSUN vs. Insum Remix) / Poison (Veleno Music)
 04. Phoenix (Micky Noise Remix) / Essentials Vol.2 (Dacru Records)
 06. Future People (Synthon Remix) / Funktion 2 (3l3mental Records)
 05. Set The Pace (Prototype Remix) / Prototype — Epic Chords (Planet BEN)

External links 
 Discography 
 №1 DJ Psy Trance
 Official YouTube channel
 SynSUN interview, GOA festival 2010
 SynSUN interview 
 ANDI VAX interview relating SynSUN on electro-music

Psychedelic trance musicians
Trance music
Ukrainian musicians
21st-century Ukrainian musicians